There are at least 21 named lakes and reservoirs in Sharp County, Arkansas.

Lakes
Duck Pond, el.  
 Persimmon Pond, el.

Reservoirs
Catfish Lake, el.  
Cedar Lake, el.  
June Lake, el.  
Lake Cave City, el.  
Lake Cherokee, el.  
Lake Galilee, el.  
Lake Mirandy, el.  
Lake Navajo, el.  
Lake Sequoyah, el.  
Lake Sherwood, el.  
Lake Thunderbird, el.  
Lower Lake - Green Acres Estates, el.  
 Rainbow Lake, el.  
Runyans Lake, el.  
Spring Lake, el.  
Street Lake, el.  
Upper Lake - Green Acres Estates, el.  
 Vagabond Lake, el.  
Wild Plum Lake, el.

See also
 List of lakes in Arkansas

Notes

Bodies of water of Sharp County, Arkansas
Sharp